The women's long jump event at the 2015 Summer Universiade was held on 8 and 9 July at the Gwangju Universiade Main Stadium, Gwangju, Korea.

Medalists

Results

Qualification
Qualification: 6.25 m (Q) or at least 12 best (q) qualified for the final.

Final

References

Long
2015 in women's athletics
2015